Do It Right is the Dove Award-nominated debut from European pop group SHINEmk. It was released in both the US and the UK.

Track listing
All tracks by Mark Pennells, Zarc Porter, except Higher Love.

"Do It Right" – 3:36
"I Feel Good" – 3:21
"Do You Believe in Love" – 3:47
"More Than Words Can Say" (Andrews, Pennells, Porter, Rodgers) – 4:10
"Higher Love" (Will Jennings, Steve Winwood) – 3:32
"I Believe in You" – 4:25
"Get a Life" – 3:02
"SHINE (For All the World)" (Andrews, Pennells, Porter) – 3:08
"Lifted" – 3:30
"I'm to Blame" – 3:43
"Midnight Hour" (Andrews, Pettersen, Rodgers) – 4:11
"I'm Never Gonna Give Up on You" (Andrews, Pennells, Pettersen, Porter) – 6:00

Singles
"Do You Believe In Love" #12 Cross Rhythms Top 100 (2000)
"I Feel Good" #17 Cross Rhythms Top 100 (2000)
"More Than Words Can Say" #43 Cross Rhythms Top 100 (2000)

Personnel

Musicians
Natasha Andrews – vocals
Loretta Andrews – vocals
Hanne Pettersen – vocals
Nicki Rogers – vocals

Technical
Lynn Fuston – mastering, mixing
George King – executive producer
Mark Pennells – executive producer
Zarc Porter – programming, producer, vocal arrangement
Matt Wanstall – vocal editing
Elizabeth Workman – art direction
Paul Yates – photography

References

2000 albums
SHINEmk albums